Glabrennea gardineri is a species of air-breathing land snail, a terrestrial pulmonate gastropod mollusk in the family Streptaxidae.

Distribution 
Glabrennea gardineri is endemic to the Mahé Island and Silhouette Island in the Seychelles.

References

Streptaxidae
Gastropods described in 1909